This is a list of threatened ecological communities of Western Australia, as approved by the state Minister for the Environment in December 2006.

 Banksia attenuata woodland over species rich dense shrublands
 Perched wetlands of the Wheatbelt region with extensive stands of living Swamp Sheoak (Casuarina obesa) and Paperbark (Melaleuca strobophylla) across the lake floor
 Shrublands on southern Swan Coastal Plain Ironstones (Busselton area)
 Sedgelands in Holocene dune swales of the southern Swan Coastal Plain
 Stromatolite like freshwater microbialite community of coastal brackish lakes
 Stromatolite like microbialite community of coastal freshwater lakes
 Communities of Tumulus Springs (Organic Mound Springs, Swan Coastal Plain)
 Shrublands and woodlands of the eastern side of the Swan Coastal Plain
 Perth to Gingin Ironstone Association
 Shrublands and woodlands on Muchea Limestone
 Rimstone Pools and Cave Structures Formed by Microbial Activity on Marine Shorelines
 Callitris preissii (or Melaleuca lanceolata) forests and woodlands, Swan Coastal Plain
 Shrublands on calcareous silts of the Swan Coastal Plain
 Southern wet shrublands, Swan Coastal Plain

References

Natural history of Western Australia
Threatened ecological communities of Western Australia
Ecological communities of Western Australia